David Wayne Sells (born September 18, 1946) is a retired professional baseball player who played four seasons for the California Angels and Los Angeles Dodgers of Major League Baseball.

References

1946 births
Living people
Major League Baseball pitchers
California Angels players
Los Angeles Dodgers players
Salt Lake City Angels players
Albuquerque Dukes players
Salt Lake City Gulls players
El Paso Sun Kings players
Shreveport Braves players
Decatur Commodores players
San Jose Bees players
Arizona Instructional League Giants players
Baseball players from California
People from Vacaville, California